The 1999 season of the 3. divisjon, the fourth highest association football league for men in Norway.

Between 20 and 24 games (depending on group size) were played in 19 groups, with 3 points given for wins and 1 for draws. All group winners were promoted to the 2. divisjon, as well as some of the best runners-up.

Tables 

Group 1
Strømmen – promoted
Spydeberg
Fjellhamar
Skeid 2
Lisleby
Grorud
Frigg
Korsvoll
Skjetten 2
Røa – relegated
Rælingen – relegated
Askim – relegated

Group 2
Fossum – promoted
Rygge
Moss 2
Kjelsås 2
Bjerke
Høland
Greåker
Torp
Sørumsand
Kolbotn – relegated
Eidsvold – relegated
Holter – relegated

Group 3
Kongsvinger 2 – promoted
Rakkestad – promoted
Sparta
Trysil
Fagerborg
Selbak
Navestad
Grue
Galterud
Oppegård – relegated
Bøler – relegated
Brandval – relegated

Group 4
Vardal – promoted
Lom
Lillehammer FK (-> FF Lillehammer 2)
Vang
Sør-Aurdal
Kvam
Ham-Kam 2
Toten
Raufoss 2
Fart
Nordre Land – relegated
Vinstra – relegated

Group 5
Mercantile – promoted
Birkebeineren
Vestfossen
Mjøndalen
Teie
Holmen
Borre
Grindvoll
Falk
Fram – relegated
Svelvik – relegated
Strømsgodset 2 – relegated

Group 6
Odd Grenland 2 – promoted
Eik-Tønsberg 2 – promoted
Larvik Turn
Rjukan
Åmot
Snøgg (-> Notodden FK)
Åssiden
Flint
Langangen
Halsen – relegated
Stag – relegated
Tjølling – relegated

Group 7
Vigør – promoted
Vindbjart
Jerv
Våg
Kvinesdal
Øyestad
Lyngdal
Seljord
Langesund (-> Langesund/Stathelle)
Søgne – relegated
Sørfjell – relegated
Stathelle – relegated (-> Langesund/Stathelle)

Group 8
Hundvåg – promoted
Klepp
Bryne 2
Eiger
Figgjo
Staal
Rosseland
Hana
Ganddal
Kåsen – relegated
Havørn – relegated
Lura – relegated

Group 9
Nord – promoted
Trott
Vedavåg
Hovding
Lyngbø
Bremnes
Skjold
Trio
Kopervik – relegated
Åkra – relegated
Bjørnar – relegated
Odda – relegated

Group 10
Løv-Ham – promoted
Nest-Sotra
Kleppestø (-> Askøy FK)
Vadmyra
Hald
Nordhordland
Florvåg (-> Askøy FK)
Follese
Bjarg
Loddefjord – relegated
Kjøkkelvik – relegated
Norheimsund – relegated

Group 11
Fjøra – promoted
Jotun – promoted
Stryn
Sandane
Dale
Svelgen
Årdalstangen/Lærdal
Jølster
Høyang
Eikefjord
Eid
Måløy – relegated

Group 12
Spjelkavik – promoted
Stranda – promoted
Velledalen og Ringen
Langevåg
Hødd 2
Bergsøy
Aalesund 2
Brattvåg
Ellingsøy
Åram/Vankam
Ha/No
Hasundgot – relegated
Skodje – relegated

Group 13
Dahle – promoted
Surnadal
Åndalsnes
Vestnes Varfjell
Kristiansund
Bøfjord
Ekko/Aureosen
Gossen
Rival
Grykameratene
Søya – relegated
Bud – relegated

Group 14
Tiller – promoted
Melhus
Nidelv
NTNUI
Løkken
Rissa
KIL/Hemne
Freidig
Frøya
Singsås – relegated
Orkla 2 – relegated
Glimt – relegated

Group 15
Levanger – promoted
Stjørdals-Blink
Bangsund
Varden
Kvik
Malvik
Fram
Selbu
Bogen
Vinne – relegated
Sandvollan – relegated
Heimdal – relegated

Group 16
Steigen – promoted
Fauske/Sprint – promoted
Tverlandet
Sandnessjøen
Sørfold
Saltdalkameratene
Bossmo & Ytteren – relegated
Korgen
Nesna
Mosjøen 2
Mo 2 – relegated

Group 17
Harstad 2
Grovfjord – promoted
Skånland
Morild
Vågakameratene
Flakstad
Leknes
Kvæfjord
Landsås
Medkila
Ajaks – relegated
Narvik 2 – relegated

Group 18
Salangen – promoted
Ramfjord
Fløya
Tromsø 2
Tromsdalen 2
Ulfstind
Bardu
Pioner
Mellembygd/Målselv
Søndre Torsken – relegated
Lyngstuva
Storsteinnes – relegated

Group 19
Bossekop – promoted
Kautokeino
Nordlys
Norild
Sørøy Glimt
Polarstjernen
Lakselv/Porsanger (-> Porsanger)
Tverrelvdalen
Honningsvåg
Nordkinn – relegated
Hammerfest 2 – relegated

References

Norwegian Third Division seasons
4
Norway
Norway